Luigi Ricci (8 July 1805 – 31 December 1859), was an Italian composer, particularly of operas.
He was the elder brother of Federico Ricci, with whom he collaborated on several works.  He was also a conductor.

Life 
Ricci was born and educated in Naples, where he wrote his first opera at the conservatory in 1823. His triumphs in 1831 at La Scala with Chiara di Rosembergh and in 1834 with Un'avventura di Scaramuccia made him famous throughout Europe, and in 1835 he and his younger brother Federico collaborated in the first of the four operas they wrote together.

In 1837 Ricci ran into financial problems, brought about mainly by his extravagant life-style. He was forced to accept a job at Trieste, and he composed no operas for seven years.  Then, however, he fell in love, at the same time, with both Francesca and Ludmila, the 17-year-old identical twin sisters of the singer Teresa Stolz, also singers, and this inspired him to create (in 1845) an opera for them both to sing in, at Odessa. Back in Trieste he married Ludmila (without, however, letting go of the other). He then composed three more operas on his own, which were well received, although his greatest success of these years was actually Crispino e la comare, his last collaboration with his brother, of which he wrote the greater part.

Comedy was Ricci's strong suit, and though not quite reaching the level of Donizetti (whom he himself greatly admired), Crispino is generally considered one of the best Italian comic operas of the period. 'The Brewer of Preston', however, is treated irreverently by Andrea Camilleri in the novel of the same name.

His conducting credits include the world premiere of Verdi's Il corsaro.

In 1859, shortly after the production of his last opera, Ricci succumbed to mental illness, and he ended his life in a hospital in Prague.

His daughter Lella Ricci (with Ludmila, 1850–71) was an opera singer, and his son Luigi Ricci-Stolz (with Francesca, 1852–1906) was a composer, too.

Ricci's operas and their librettists

 L'impresario in angustie (G. M. Diodati), farsa – Naples, Conservatorio, 1823
 La cena frastornata (Andrea Leone Tottola) – Naples, Teatro Nuovo, Autumn 1824
 L'abbate Taccarella, ovvero Aladino (also produced as La gabbia de' matti, Poeta Taccarella, etc.) (Andrea Leone Tottola) – Naples, Teatro Nuovo, carnival 1825
 Il sogno avverato (in collaboration with Dionigio Pogliani-Gagliardi and possibly N. Zingarelli) (Andrea Leone Tottola) – Naples, Teatro Nuovo, summer 1825 
 Il diavolo condannato a prender moglie (also produced as Il diavolo mal sposato) (Andrea Leone Tottola) – Naples, Teatro Nuovo, 27 January 1827
 La lucerna di Epitteto (G. Checcherini) – Naples, Teatro Nuovo, carnival 1827
 Ulisse in Itaca (Domenico Gilardoni) – Naples, Teatro di San Carlo, 12 January 1828
 Colombo (Felice Romani) – Parma, Teatro ducale, 27 June 1829
 L'orfanella di Ginevra (Amina) (Jacopo Ferretti) – Rome, Teatro Valle, 9 September 1829
 Il sonnambulo (Jacopo Ferretti) – Rome, Teatro Valle, 26 December 1829
 Fernando Cortez, ovvero L'eroina del Messico (Jacopo Ferretti) – Rome, Teatro Tordinona, 9 February 1830
 Annibale in Torino (Felice Romani) – Turin, Teatro Regio, 26 December 1830
 La neve (Felice Romani) – Milan, Teatro Cannobiana, 21 June 1831
 Chiara di Rosemberg (Gaetano Rossi) – Milan, Teatro alla Scala, 11 October 1831, also produced as Chiara di Montalbano in France, 1835
 Il nuovo Figaro (Jacopo Ferretti) – Parma, Teatro ducale, 15 February 1832
 I due sergenti (Felice Romani) – Milan, Teatro alla Scala, 1 September 1833
 Un'avventura di Scaramuccia (Felice Romani) – Milan, Teatro alla Scala, 8 March 1834; then in Vienna (1835), London (1836), Madrid (1837), Lisbon (1838), Paris, Théâtre Italien (1846), Warsaw (1846; Polish), Brussels (1851), Buenos Aires (1851); also worked on by Friedrich von Flotow
 Gli esposti, ovvero Eran due or son tre (Jacopo Ferretti) – Turin, Teatro Angennes, 3 June 1834
 Chi dura vince ovvero La luna di miel (Jacopo Ferretti) – Rome, Teatro Valle, 26 December 1834; (revised by Federico Ricci as La petite comtesse, 1876)
 La serva e l'ussero (Magd und Husar), farsa – Pavia, Teatro Compadroni, New Year 1835
 Il colonello (also produced as La donna colonello) collaboration with Federico Ricci (Jacopo Ferretti) – Naples, Teatro del Fondo, 14 March 1835 
 Chiara di Montalbano [in Francia] (Gaetano Rossi) – Milan, Teatro alla Scala, 15 August 1835
 Il disertore per amore collaboration with Federico Ricci (Jacopo Ferretti) – Naples, Teatro del fondo, 13 February 1836 
 Le nozze di Figaro (Gaetano Rossi) – Milan, Teatro alla Scala, 13 February 1838; revised version (Milan, Teatro alla Scala, 1841)
 La solitaria delle Asturie (Felice Romani) – Odessa, Teatro Italiano, 20 February 1845
 L'amante di richiamo collaboration with Federico Ricci (F. Dall'Ongaro) – Turin, Teatro Angennes, 13 June 1846 
 Il birraio di Preston (F. Guidi) – Florence, Teatro della Pergola, 4 February 1847
 Crispino e la comare collaboration with Federico Ricci  (Francesco Maria Piave) – Venice, Teatro S. Benedetto, 28 February 1850 
 La festa di Piedigrotta (M. D'Arienzo) – Naples, Teatro Nuovo, 23 June 1852
 Il diavolo a quattro (Gaetano Rossi) – Triest, Teatro Armonia, 15 May 1859

References
Budden, Julian (1998), "Ricci, Luigi", in Stanley Sadie (ed.), The New Grove Dictionary of Opera, Vol. Three, pp. 1310–1311.  London: Macmillan Publishers, Inc.   
Budden, Julian (1998), "Ricci, Federico", in Stanley Sadie (ed.), The New Grove Dictionary of Opera, Vol. Three, pp. 1309–1310.  London: Macmillan Publishers, Inc.   
Rose, Michael (2001), "Ricci, Luigi", in Holden, Amanda (ed.), The New Penguin Opera Guide, New York: Penguin Putnam, p. 745. 
Rose, Michael (2001), "Ricci, Federico", in Holden, Amanda (ed.), The New Penguin Opera Guide, New York: Penguin Putnam, p. 744.

External links

 Short biography of Ricci brothers
 

1805 births
1859 deaths
Italian opera composers
Male opera composers
Italian classical composers
Italian male classical composers
Italian Romantic composers
Italian conductors (music)
Italian male conductors (music)
Musicians from Naples
19th-century classical composers
19th-century conductors (music)